This article lists the in the water and on the water forms of aquatic sports for 2014.

Aquatics
 January 26 – September 7: 2014 FINA Open Water Swimming Grand Prix
 January 26 at  Rosario
 Event Cancelled.
 February 2 at  Santa Fe–Coronda
 Men's winner:  Simone Ercoli
 Women's winner:  Silvie Rybarova
 February 9 at  Hernandarias–Paraná
 Men's winner:  Ivan Afanevich
 Women's winner:  Pilar Geijo
 March 29 at  Cancún
 Men's winner:  Ferry Weertman
 Women's winner:  Angela Maurer
 July 26 at  Lac Saint-Jean
 Men's winner:  Xavier Desharnais
 Women's winner:  Pilar Geijo
 August 2 at  Lac Magog
 Men's winner:  Joanes Hedel
 Women's winner:  Silvie Rybarova
 August 23 at  Lake Ohrid
 Men's winner:  Brian Ryckeman
 Women's winner:  Silvie Rybarova
 September 7 at  Capri-Naples (final)
 Men's winner:  Vilaij Khudyakov
 Women's winner:  Ana Marcela Cunha
 Overall Men's winner:  Joanes Hedel
 Overall Women's winner:  Silvie Rybarova
 February 1 – October 18: 2014 FINA 10 km Marathon Swimming World Cup
 February 1 at  Patagones–Viedma
 Men's winner:  Thomas Allen
 Women's winner:  Poliana Okimoto
 April 5 at  Cancún
 Men's winner:  Thomas Lurz
 Women's winner:  Martina Grimaldi
 June 28 at  Setúbal
 Men's winner:  Jarrod Poort
 Women's winner:  Ana Marcela Cunha
 July 24 at  Lac Saint-Jean
 Men's winner:  Andreas Waschburger
 Women's winner:  Ana Marcela Cunha
 August 1 at  Lac Magog
 Men's winner:  Alex Meyer
 Women's winner:  Ana Marcela Cunha
 August 9 at  Lac-Mégantic
 Men's winner:  Allan do Carmo
 Women's winner:  Ana Marcela Cunha
 October 12 at  Chun'an County, Hangzhou
 Men's winner:  Alan do Carmo
 Women's winner:  Ana Marcela Cunha
 Men's winner:  Christian Reichert
 Women's winner:  Anna Olasz
 Overall Men's winner:  Allan do Carmo
 Overall Women's winner:  Ana Marcela Cunha
 February 14 – October 26: 2014 FINA Diving Grand Prix
 February 14–16 at  Madrid
  won both the gold and overall medal tallies.
 February 21–23 at  Rostock
  won both the gold and overall medal tallies.
 May 1–4 at  Gatineau
  won both the gold and overall medal tallies.
 May 8–11 at  San Juan
  won both the gold and overall medal tallies.
 May 15–18 at  Guanajuato
  won both the gold and overall medal tallies.
 August 1–3 at  Bolzano
  won the gold medal tally.  won the overall medal tally.
 October 17–19 at 
  won the gold and overall medal tallies.
 October 24–26 at  Kuala Lumpur (final)
  won the gold medal tally. China and host nation, won 10 overall medals each.
 March 14 – June 8: 2014 FINA/NVC Diving World Series
 March 14–16 at  Beijing
 Host nation, won both the gold and overall medal tallies.
 March 20–22 at  Dubai
  won both the gold and overall medal tallies.
 April 25–27 at  London
  won both the gold and overall medal tallies.
 May 2–4 at  Moscow
  won both the gold and overall medal tallies.
 May 30 – June 1 at  Windsor
  won both the gold and overall medal tallies.
 June 6–8 at  Monterrey
  won both the gold and overall medal tallies.
 Overall Men's winner:  He Chong
 Overall Women's winner:  Wang Han
 July 15–20: 2014 FINA Diving World Cup in  Shanghai
  won both the gold and overall medal tallies.
 July 27 – August 10: 2014 FINA World Masters Championships at  Montreal
 For all the results, click here.
 August 8–10: 2014 FINA High Diving World Cup at  Kazan (debut event)
 Men's High Dive winner:  Orlando Duque
 Women's High Dive winner:  Rachelle Simpson
 August 13–24: 2014 European Aquatics Championships at  Berlin
  won both the gold and overall medal tallies.
 August 17–22: 2014 Summer Youth Olympics Swimming Events
  won both the gold and overall medal tallies.
 August 21–24: 2014 Pan Pacific Swimming Championships at  Gold Coast
 The  won both the gold and overall medal tallies.
 August 23–27: 2014 Summer Youth Olympics Diving Events
  won both the gold and overall medal tallies.
 August 27 – November 2: 2014 FINA Swimming World Cup
 August 27 & 28 in  Doha
  won the gold medal tally. The  won the overall medal tally.
 August 31 & September 1 in  Dubai
  won the gold medal tally. The  won the overall medal tally.
 September 29 & 30 in 
  won the gold and overall medal tallies.
 October 4 & 5 in  Moscow
  won the gold and overall medal tallies.
 October 24 & 25 in  Beijing
  won the gold medal tally. Host nation, won the overall medal tally.
 October 28 & 29 in  Tokyo
  won the gold medal tally.  club won the overall medal tally. Note: This team is separate from the main Japanese one. 
  won the gold medal tally.  and the  won 15 overall medals each.
 Overall winners:  Chad le Clos (m) /  Katinka Hosszú (f)
 September 5–7: 2014 FINA World Junior Open Water Swimming Championships in  Balatonfüred
 Note: This event was scheduled to be held in Eilat, Israel, from August 28–30. However, FINA has voted unanimously to move the event because of the 2014 Israel–Gaza conflict to Hungary instead.
 Junior Boys' 7.5 km winner:  Anton Evsikov 
 Junior Girls' 7.5 km winner:  Kiss Nikoletta
 Junior Team 3 km winner: 
 Youth Boys' 5 km winner:  Taylor Abbott
 Youth Girls' 5 km winner:  YAN Siyu
 Youth Team 3 km winner: 
 September 9–14: 2014 World Junior Diving Championships at  Penza
  won both the gold and overall medal tallies.
 October 2–5: 2014 FINA Synchronized Swimming World Cup at  Quebec City
 Duet winners:  Huang Xuechen and Sun Wenyan
 Team winners: 
 Combination winners: 
 Highlight winners: 
 October 22–26: 2014 FINA World Junior Synchronised Swimming Championships at  Helsinki
  won the gold medal tally.  and Russia won 4 overall medals each.
 December 3–7: 2014 FINA World Swimming Championships (25 m) at  Doha
  won the gold medal tally. The  won the overall medal tally.
 December 12–14: 2014 FINA Synchro World Trophy at  Beijing
  took all the gold medals in this event. China and  have 5 overall medals each.

Canoeing
 July 12–13: COPAC American Championships 2014 in  Huauchinango
 Men's C1 winner:  Felipe Da Silva
 Men's C2 winners:  Anderson Oliveira
 Men's K1 winner:  Pedro da Silva
 Women's C1 winner:  Ana Sátila
 Women's K1 winner:  Ana Sátila

Flatwater (canoe) sprint
 May 2–25: 2014 ICF Canoe Sprint World Cup
 May 2–4 at  Milan
 Host nation, won both the gold and overall medal tallies.
 May 16–18 at  Račice
  won both the gold and overall medal tallies.
 May 23–25 at  Szeged
 Host nation, won both the gold and overall medal tallies.
 June 26–29: 2014 Canoe Sprint Junior & U23 European Championships in  Mantes-en-Yvelines
 Junior:  won the gold medal tally.  won the overall medal tally.
 U23:  won both the gold and overall medal tallies.
 July 11–13: 2014 Canoe Sprint European Championships in  Brandenburg
  won the gold medal tally. Hungary and  won 13 overall medals each.
 July 17–20: 2014 ICF Junior and U23 Canoe Sprint World Championships in   Szeged
 Junior: Host nation, won both the gold and overall medal tallies.
 U23: Host nation, Hungary, won the gold medal tally.  and Hungary won 6 overall medals each.
 Overall winner: 
 August 6–10: 2014 ICF Canoe Sprint World Championships in  Moscow
  won both the gold and overall medal tallies.
 August 23–27: 2014 Summer Youth Olympics
  and  won 2 gold medals each. The  won the overall medal tally.

Rowing
 March 28 – July 13: 2014 World Rowing Cup
 March 28–30: World Rowing Cup 1 at  Sydney
 Host nation, won both the gold and overall medal tallies.
 June 20–22: World Rowing Cup 2 at  Lac d'Aiguebelette
  won both the gold and overall medal tallies.
 July 11–13: World Rowing Cup 3 at  Lucerne
  won the gold medal tally.  won the overall medal tally.
 May 24 & 25: 2014 European Rowing Junior Championships at  Hazewinkel
  won both the gold and overall medal tallies.
 May 30 – June 1: 2014 European Rowing Championships at  Belgrade
  and  won 2 gold medals each. However,  won the overall medal tally.
 June 20–22: 2014 Henley Women's Regatta at  Henley-on-Thames
 June 20 results here. June 21 results here. June 22 results here.
 July 2–6: 2014 Henley Royal Regatta at  Henley-on-Thames
 For the results, click here.
 July 23–27: 2014 World Rowing U23 Championships at  Varese
  and the  won 3 gold medals each. Host nation, won the overall medal tally.
 August 6–10: 2014 World Rowing Junior Championships at  Hamburg
 Host nation, won both the gold and overall medal tallies.
 August 17–20: 2014 Summer Youth Olympics
 Boys' Single Sculls:   Tim Ole Naske;   Boris Yotov;   Dan de Groot
 Boys' Pairs:   Gheorghe Robert Dedu / Ciprian Tudosa;   Miroslav Jech / Lukas Helesic;   Gokhan Guven / Eren Can Aslan
 Girls' Single Sculls:   Krystsina Staraselets;   Athina Maria Angelopoulou;   Camille Juillet
 Girls' Pairs:   Cristina Georgiana Popescu / Denisa Tilvescu;   LUO Yadan / PAN Jie;   Larissa Werbicki / Caileigh Filmer 
 August 24–31: 2014 World Rowing Championships at  Amsterdam
  won the gold medal tally.  won the overall medal tally.
 July 17–20: Rowing at the Pan American Sports Festival 2014 in  Cuemanco
 Men's Single Sculls winner:  Ángel Fournier
 Men's Double Sculls winners:  Ángel Fournier / Eduardo Rubio
 Men's Quadruple Sculls winners:  Ángel Fournier / Eduardo Rubio / Orlando Sotolongo / Janier Concepción
 Men's Pairs winners:  Leopoldo Tejada Rios / Patrick Loliger
 Men's Fours winners:  Janier Concepción / Adrian Oquendo / Solaris Freire / Jorber Avila
 Men's Lightweight Double Sculls winners:  Jhosymar Valenzuela Ponce / Alonso Ramirez Rosales
 Men's Lightweight Fours winners:  Raul Hernandez / Liosbel Hernandez / Leosmel Ramos / Wilber Turro
 Women's Single Sculls winner:  Gabriela Best
 Women's Double Sculls winners:  Yariulvis Cobas / Aimee Hernandez
 Women's Pairs winners:  Maria Laura Abalo / Gabriela Best
 Women's Quadruple Sculls winners:  Maria Laura Abalo / Gabriela Best / Milka Kraljev / María Clara Rohner
 Women's Lightweight Single Sculls winners:  Yislena Hernandez
 Women's Lightweight Double Sculls winners:  Fabiana Beltrame / Gabriela Eduarda Cardozo

Sailing
 October 12, 2013 – April 26, 2014: ISAF Sailing World Cup
 October 12–19, 2013 at  Qingdao
 Host nation, won both the gold and overall medal tallies.
 December 1–8, 2013 at  Melbourne
 Host nation, won both the gold and overall medal tallies.
 January 26 – February 1, 2014 at  Miami
  won both the gold and overall medal tallies.
 March 29 – April 5, 2014 at  Palma, Majorca
  won both the gold and overall medal tallies.
 April 19–26, 2014 at  Hyères
Australia and  both won 5 overall medals each.
 Overall gold medal winner: . Overall medal winner: .
 July 12–19: 2014 ISAF Youth Sailing World Championship at  Tavira
  won both the gold and overall medal tallies. Also, Spain won the Nations Cup.
 August 18–24: 2014 Summer Youth Olympics
 Byte CII – Boy's One Person Dinghy:   Bernie Cheok Khoon Chin;   Rodolfo Pires;   Jonatan Vadnai
 Byte CII – Girl's One Person Dinghy:   Samantha Yom;   Odile van Aanholt;   Jarian Brandes
 Techno 293 – Men's Windsurfer:   Francisco Cruz Saubidet Birkner;   Maxim Tokarev;   Lars van Someren
 Techno 293 – Women's Windsurfer:   WU Linli;   Mariam Sekhposyan;   Lucie Pianazza
 September 8–21: 2014 ISAF Sailing World Championships at  Santander
  won the gold medal tally. , France, and  won 4 overall medals each.

Water polo

Men
 November 12, 2013 – April 15, 2014: 2014 FINA Water Polo World League for European Men's Teams
 Europe Group A winner: 
 Europe Group B winner: 
 Europe Group C winner: 
 May 27 – June 1: 2014 FINA Water Polo World League Intercontinental Tournament for Men at  Shanghai
 June 16–21: 2014 Men's Super Final in  Dubai
  defeated , 10–6, to claim its eighth FINA water polo title.  took the bronze medal.
 August 19–24: 2014 FINA Men's Water Polo World Cup in  Almaty
  defeated , 11–9 in overtime, to claim its third water polo World Cup title.  took the bronze medal.

Women
 November 19, 2013 – April 22, 2014: 2014 FINA Water Polo World League for Women
 Europe Group A winners:  and 
 Europe Group B winner: 
 May 19–25: 2014 FINA Water World League International Tournament for Women at  Riverside, California
 June 10–15: 2014 Women's Super Final in  Kunshan
 The  defeated , 10–8, to claim its eighth title.  took the bronze medal.
 August 12–17: 2014 FINA Women's Water Polo World Cup in  Khanty-Mansiysk
 The  defeated , 10–6, to claim its third World Cup win.  took third place.

Whitewater (canoe) slalom
 June 6 – August 17: 2014 Canoe Slalom World Cup (including the final)
 June 6–8: World Cup #1 in  Lee Valley
 Host nation, won both the gold and overall medal tallies.
 June 13–15: World Cup #2 in  Ljubljana – Tacen
  won both the gold and overall medal tallies.
 June 20–22: World Cup #3 in  Prague
 August 1–3: World Cup #4 in  La Seu d'Urgell
 Host nation, and  won 2 gold medals each. However,  won the overall medal tally.
 August 15–17: World Cup #5 (final) in  Augsburg
 Host nation, won both the gold and overall medal tallies.
 April 23–27: 2014 ICF Junior & U23 World Canoe Slalom Championships in  Penrith
 Junior results: The  won both the gold and overall medal tallies. 
 U23 results: Host nation, and  won 2 gold medals each. However, the Czech Republic won the overall medals tally.
 August 23–27: 2014 Summer Youth Olympics
 Go to the Flatwater (canoe) sprint section for information.
 September 17–21: 2014 ICF Canoe Slalom World Championships in  Deep Creek Lake
  won both the gold and overall medal tallies.

References

 
2014 in sports
Water sports by year
Aquatics